List of speakers of the Council of Representatives of Bahrain.

This is a list of speakers of the Council of Representatives of Bahrain.

From 1973 to 1975, Bahrain has unicameral legislature, Constitutional Parliament, which was dissolved in 1975. The Speaker of the council was Ebrahim Al-Arrayedh.

Footnote and references

Politics of Bahrain
Bahrain
 
2002 establishments in Bahrain